Asperula xylorrhiza is a species of flowering plant in the family Rubiaceae. It is endemic to Turkey and Iraq.

References 

xylorrhiza
Flora of Turkey
Flora of Iraq